Upper Batkhela is one of three administrative unit, known as Union council, of Batkhela Tehsil other being the Lower Batkhela and Middle Batkhela in the Khyber Pakhtunkhwa province of Pakistan.

District Malakand has 2 Tehsils i.e. Swat Ranizai and Sam Ranizai. Each Tehsil comprises certain numbers of Union councils. There are 28 union councils in district Malakand.

See also 

Malakand District

External links
Khyber-Pakhtunkhwa Government website section on Lower Dir
United Nations
Hajjinfo.org Uploads
PBS paiman.jsi.com

Malakand District
Populated places in Malakand District
Union councils of Khyber Pakhtunkhwa
Union Councils of Malakand District